Kate Elizabeth Sutton  (née Piper; born 12 October 1983) is an English writer, activist, television presenter and model from Andover, Hampshire.

In March 2008, she was attacked with acid by her ex-boyfriend and an accomplice, causing major damage to her face and blindness in one eye. Piper underwent pioneering surgery to restore her face and vision. Both attackers were convicted and given life sentences. In 2018, one of the attackers was released after serving nine years in prison.

In 2009, Piper gave up her right to anonymity in order to increase awareness about burn victims. Her experience was documented in the 2009 Channel 4 documentary Katie: My Beautiful Face part of the Cutting Edge series.  It has subsequently been sold internationally.

More recently, Piper has appeared in follow-up series for Channel 4, released a best-selling autobiography, and had a regular column in weekly magazines. She also presents the Channel 4 television series Bodyshockers about members of the public about to undergo body-altering procedures and those who regret procedures they have had. Her main work has been for the Katie Piper Foundation, which she founded to help victims of burns and other disfigurement injuries. On 13 August 2018, she was announced as the first contestant for that year's Strictly Come Dancing. On 11 September 2020 BBC media announced that Katie Piper would be joining their BBC1 Songs of Praise team as a feature presenter, scheduling her debut broadcast on 20 September. Piper had previously appeared as a guest, with her mother on the 2020 Mothers Day edition, when she explained the moment she found her faith. In July 2021, Piper became a panellist on Loose Women.

Early life and education
Piper was born in Andover, Hampshire, to David and Diane Piper and attended Harrow Way School and Portway Junior School as a child. She has an elder brother, Paul and a younger sister, Suzy.

After leaving school, Piper trained as a beautician, aiming to build on her fondness for fashion and beauty, and to follow in the footsteps of her father, who worked as a barber.

Career prior to attack
Piper subsequently began a career in modelling, taking part in various fashion, glamour and promotional photoshoots, including modelling for national newspapers. She also began work as a promotional model: appearing and carrying out publicity duties at live events, such as working as a ring-card girl at martial arts fixtures.

Piper also conducted a career as a digital television presenter, working principally on web-TV shows and features, and on small digital television channels, primarily in the shopping and live-chat fields. As her career began to develop, Piper moved away from her family home in Hampshire, and began to live with friends in a flat in Golders Green, North London.

Assault and acid attack
Daniel Lynch, a martial arts enthusiast who had been tracking Piper's media and modelling career, met her through Facebook. The two first met in person in Reading, Berkshire, where Piper had been working, and initially Piper was pleased with the relationship.

Two weeks into their relationship, the couple booked into a hotel in Bayswater, following a meal out. In the hotel room, Lynch raped and beat Piper, threatened to cut her with a razor and hang her, and stabbed her several times in the arms. After eight hours at the hotel, they drove back to Piper's Golders Green flat. Piper was treated for her wounds at Royal Free Hospital, but withheld the nature of the incident from the doctors and police, because she was afraid of Lynch.

Piper received numerous phone calls and apologies from Lynch. On 31 March 2008, two days after the initial attack, Lynch persuaded Piper to go to an internet cafe to read an email he had sent to her Facebook account. Lynch gave her details to Stefan Sylvestre, who identified her on Golders Green Road. Wearing a hoodie to obscure his identity, Sylvestre approached Piper, who thought he was going to ask for money, and then threw sulphuric acid at her face.

The attack was caught on CCTV, and both Lynch and Sylvestre were later arrested.

Lynch received two life sentences, and will serve a minimum of 16 years. Sylvestre received a life sentence, and was told he would serve a minimum of 6 years. Sylvestre's parole application for release was approved in 2018.  In 2022 it was reported Sylvestre had breached the terms of his parole on numerous occasions and is now being hunted by police after going on the run and allegedly leaving the UK in August 2022, where he faces being recalled to prison when found.

Treatment and recovery
Immediately after the attack, Piper ran into a local café, where an ambulance was called. Piper was treated in Chelsea and Westminster Hospital, where her treatment was led by plastic surgeon Mohammad Ali Jawad. The acid, some of which Piper had swallowed, blinded her in her left eye, and caused partial thickness and full thickness burns. The surgeons completely removed the skin of Piper's face, and replaced it with a skin substitute, Matriderm, to build the foundations for a skin graft. This procedure was the first of its kind to be done in a single operation.

Piper was put into an induced coma for 12 days. She has been through numerous surgical operations to treat her injuries, and wore a plastic face mask for 23 hours a day, which flattened the scars and helped retain moisture. As part of her care from the National Health Service, Piper was treated at a clinic in Southern France. The treatment she received there was designed to break down scar tissue, and prevent skin contraction.

Subsequent to the attack, Piper moved out of her London flat and returned to Hampshire to live with her parents and younger sister Suzy.

Personal life
Near the end of 2009, Katie Piper established a charity, the Katie Piper Foundation, aimed at raising awareness of the plight of victims of burns and other disfigurement injuries: the charity also campaigns for the specialist treatment Piper received, such as the after-care scheme undertaken in France, to be more widely available to patients in Britain.

Following her recovery and the successful establishment of the Katie Piper Foundation, Piper again moved out of the family home and returned to living alone in London, a process documented in episodes of Katie: My Beautiful Face; she later moved to live with her partner Richard Sutton, a carpenter.

On 14 March 2014, she gave birth to their first child, Belle Elizabeth. In December 2014, she announced her engagement to Sutton. They married on 6 November 2015. On 13 December 2017, she gave birth to their second child, Penelope Diane.

Formerly an atheist, Piper turned to Christianity after the attack.

Filmography

Filmography

Television and radio

Katie: My Beautiful Face 

Although Piper had the right to remain anonymous because of the sexual assault, she chose to waive her anonymity, in an attempt to increase public awareness of the situation for burn victims, and also the treatment they go through. Piper also took part in a documentary about her experience, Katie: My Beautiful Face, which was aired by Channel 4 on 29 October 2009, and, according to figures from Attentional, gained over 3.3 million viewers. The programme has been rebroadcast several times and in a number of territories.

Alternative Christmas Message 
On 25 December 2009, Piper read the Alternative Christmas Message on Channel 4. The message was about Piper's own experiences, family and not judging people by their appearance.

Piper also featured in one of the two 2011 Alternative Christmas Messages, alongside participants from Seven Dwarves, Beauty and the Beast: Ugly Face of Prejudice and My Transsexual Summer - for a message with the theme "Just Be Yourself" (the other message featured senior staff from the school featured in Educating Essex.)

20/20 
On 8 January 2010, the ABC (US)'s news-magazine television series 20/20 featured Piper as its primary subject. The programme consisted of an interview conducted by Elizabeth Vargas, and footage of Piper at home, including material which had appeared in Katie: My Beautiful Face.

Katie: My Beautiful Friends 
Piper worked again with Mentorn Media, producer of Katie: My Beautiful Face, in a series titled Katie: My Beautiful Friends. In this, she met people who were disfigured, disabled or physically altered as a result of illness, injury, assault, accident or surgery. The films also chronicled the development and growth of the Katie Piper Foundation and began its four-part run on 22 March 2011. Items of supporting information and relevant associated content relating to the programme were placed on the Channel 4 website in tandem with the programme's broadcast. The series was broadcast in the US on the OWN channel from 16 August 2011.

Episode guide

Katie: The Science of Seeing Again 
On 7 February 2012, Channel 4 broadcast a new one-off film featuring Piper as she prepared to undergo stem-cell surgery in a bid to restore sight in her damaged left eye. Katie: The Science of Seeing Again saw Piper look into the biology of the eye, visit the US to look into the religious and moral debate around the use of embryos in stem-cell research, and monitored her as she underwent the treatment by surgeon Sheraz Daya at Centre for Sight in East Grinstead, West Sussex. As with Piper's five previous Channel 4 films, this was produced by Mentorn Media. Within the programme Piper revealed she had undergone 109 medical operations in the four years since the acid attack, with the eye operation being her 110th.

Bodyshockers 

In spring 2013, at around the same time as Piper's participation in Gok Live was confirmed, her next solo Channel 4 project was announced, which was to be a new documentary series, provisionally titled Undo Me, which would look at cosmetic and surgical procedures, and give advice to those looking to restore a more natural look having previously undergone treatments they now regret. It was initially slated for broadcast in late 2013 but eventually began to air weekly from 30 January 2014, by which time the proposed six-episode series had shrunk to four parts and acquired the name Bodyshockers, with each episode having a sub-title linked to the episode's main theme.

In summer 2014 it was confirmed that a second series of Bodyshockers had been commissioned, thus becoming the first of Piper's programmes to be reordered for a second run. This second series, which has seen the show acquire the sub-title "Nips, Tucks and Tattoos", began transmitting from 5 January 2015. In February 2015, it was announced that a third series had been ordered commissioned.

Other TV and radio work 
Katie Piper has appeared on a number of television and radio programmes to talk about her experience; the Australian series 60 Minutes featured Piper in November 2009. In the same month, she appeared on Channel 4's Krishnan Guru-Murthy-hosted television-led debate The TV Show to discuss the reaction to the original documentary.

Piper has also appeared as a guest on a number of British magazine and news programmes including Live From Studio Five, Woman's Hour, BBC Breakfast and This Morning.

In October 2012, Piper participated in a new week-long series for Channel 4. Hotel GB saw a group of Channel 4 personalities - headed by Mary Portas, Gordon Ramsay, Gok Wan, Kirstie Allsopp, Phil Spencer, Christian Jessen, Kim Woodburn and Piper - running a London hotel with the aim of training a group of young unemployed people for potential careers in the hospitality industry, with viewers able to visit the hotel as guests and use the facilities. Piper drew on her past as a beautician to run the hotel's salon/spa area, assisted by one of the apprentices, Manisha.

In 2013, Piper took part in The Secret Millions, a Secret Millionaire spin-off in which each of five C4 hosts—Piper, Gok Wan, George Clarke, David Fishwick and Jimmy Doherty—work with a charitable or public-service organisation, running a scheme or pilot with the aid of disadvantaged or unemployed individuals, with the aim of convincing the Big Lottery Fund to give up to £2 million of funding (per scheme) for such projects to be rolled out more fully. Piper's episode aired on 14 April 2013 as the fourth of five transmitted; it featured a project in which prisoners were prepared for re-entry into the workplace by undertaking working placements in furniture manufacture. In the week leading up to the Secret Millions broadcast, The Community Channel repeated several of Piper's Channel 4 documentaries.

In summer 2013, Piper worked alongside Gok Wan as a regular participant in a new live fashion series on Channel 4. The three-part Gok Live: Stripping for Summer was broadcast over three weeks from the plaza of MediaCityUK in Salford Quays, with Piper in attendance at each week's makeover, as well as filing filmed reports on summer beauty tips for each episode. The commission of Undo Me was confirmed around the same time as that of Gok Live, but Gok Live went to air first.

Piper also appeared as a box-opener in Gok Wan's edition of Celebrity Deal or No Deal in 2013.

Piper presents Channel 4's Never Seen a Doctor, which began on 4 May 2016.

In 2018, Piper became a brand ambassador for Swarovski, alongside celebrity chef Nadiya Hussain and CoppaFeel founder, Kris Hallenga.

On 13 August 2018, Piper was announced on BBC Breakfast as the first contestant in that year's Strictly Come Dancing. She was partnered with professional dancer Gorka Marquez and was the third contestant to be eliminated.

Piper became a feature presenter on Songs of Praise with effect from 20 September 2020.

On 23 July 2021, it was confirmed that Piper would become a panellist on Loose Women.

Writing

Autobiography 
Piper's autobiography, called Beautiful, was published in paperback by Ebury Press on 17 February 2011.

Subsequent books 

Following the success of Beautiful, Piper signed a three-book deal with publisher Quercus. The first of these was a self-help book titled Things Get Better: If you believe then you will survive, followed by a page-a-day compilation of positive affirmations, quotes and mantras, Start Your Day with Katie, both of which were published in 2012. A second volume of memoirs, titled Beautiful Ever After, was released in 2014.

Piper released her next book Confidence: the Secret in late 2016.

In 2018, Piper and her mother published the book From Mother to Daughter: The Things I'd Tell My Child through Quercus.

As a columnist 

Piper wrote a regular column in Reveal magazine between April 2011 and July 2012. In October 2012 she began contributing a weekly column for Now magazine, which ran until January 2014. She has also written occasional one-off 'guest columns' for newspapers including the Sunday Mirror and its stablemate, the Sunday People.

Honours, awards and nominations

Katie: My Beautiful Face was nominated for Best Single Documentary at the BAFTA Television Awards in June 2010, but did not win; the trophy was awarded to BBC One's Wounded.

Piper won the "Women to Watch: Inspiration" award at Red magazine's "Red's Hot Women Awards" in 2010.

In February 2011, Katie: My Beautiful Face won the "Best Documentary Programme" award at the Broadcast Awards; Piper attended to collect the prize alongside the film-makers.

Piper was awarded the "You Can" Award at the Sainsbury's Women of the Year Awards 2011.

In 2012, Piper received a 'Pride of Britain' award.

In 2014, Piper became an Honorary Doctor of Health Sciences at Anglia Ruskin University. 

Piper was appointed Officer of the Order of the British Empire (OBE) in the 2022 New Year Honours for services to charity and victims of burns and other disfigurement injuries.

See also
 List of Strictly Come Dancing contestants

References

External links
The Katie Piper Foundation

1983 births
Acid attack victims
English victims of crime
English television presenters
Living people
People from Andover, Hampshire
Violence against women in England
Officers of the Order of the British Empire
Former atheists and agnostics
Converts to Christianity
Television presenters with disabilities
English Christians